George Nolan Leary (April 26, 1889 – December 12, 1987) was an American actor and playwright.

Leary was born in Rock Island County, Illinois. His acting career started in France during World War I, providing entertainment for United States Troops. In 1919 he appeared in the Broadway play Forbidden, playing the Second Lieutenant and Luke O'Keefe. Other Broadway appearances included productions of Happy Landing, Rendezvous and Dodsworth. 

He later appeared in films and on television. His film appearances included roles in The Valley of Vanishing Men, Strangler of the Swamp, That Texas Jamboree, Out California Way, Love Laughs at Andy Hardy, I Wonder Who's Kissing Her Now, The Secret Life of Walter Mitty and Devil Bat's Daughter. Leary retired in 1981, after making his final TV appearance in Nero Wolfe.

Leary died in December 1987 at the Good Samaritan Hospital in Los Angeles, California, at the age of 98. He was buried in Hollywood Forever Cemetery.

References

External links 

Rotten Tomatoes profile

1889 births
1997 deaths
People from Rock Island County, Illinois
Male actors from Illinois
American male film actors
American male television actors
American male stage actors
American dramatists and playwrights
20th-century American male actors
Burials at Hollywood Forever Cemetery
Western (genre) television actors
Male Western (genre) film actors